Zalqaraağac (also, Zalkaraagach) is a village and municipality in the Sabirabad Rayon of Azerbaijan.  It has a population of 889.

References 

Populated places in Sabirabad District